Starovokzalna is the final station of the right-bank line the Kyiv Light Rail, located near the city's main railway station Kyiv-Pasazhyrskyi. It was originally opened in 1989 as a tram stop. On October 16, 2010, the station was reopened after reconstruction to service light rail trams.

External links
 

Kyiv Light Rail stations